John Leslie Helmer (June 16, 1921 – August 22, 1967) was an American bobsledder who competed in the early 1950s. He finished seventh in the two-man event at the 1952 Winter Olympics in Oslo.

References
1952 bobsleigh two-man results
Wallechinsky, David (1984). "Bobsled: Two-man". In The Complete Book of the Olympics: 1896-1980. New York: Penguin Books. p. 558.
John L. Helmer's profile at Sports Reference.com

American male bobsledders
Olympic bobsledders of the United States
Bobsledders at the 1952 Winter Olympics
1921 births
1967 deaths